Kenneth Hood "Buddy" MacKay Jr. (born March 22, 1933) is an American politician and diplomat who served as the 42nd governor of Florida for 24 days from December 1998 to January 1999, upon the death of Lawton Chiles. A member of the Democratic Party, he previously served as the 14th lieutenant governor of Florida from 1991 to 1998. During his career, he also served as a state legislator, a U.S. representative, and special envoy for the Americas.

Early life
MacKay was born to a citrus-farming family in Ocala, Florida, the son of Julia Elizabeth (Farnum) and Kenneth Hood MacKay. He served in the United States Air Force during the 1950s, and then attended the University of Florida, where he was tapped into  Florida Blue Key and eventually received a law degree. MacKay was inducted into the University of Florida Hall of Fame (the most prestigious honor a student can receive from UF) and was a member of The Board. He married Anne Selph in 1960; the couple has four sons.

Political career
MacKay was elected to the Florida House of Representatives in 1968, and to the Florida Senate in 1974.

From 1983 to 1989 he served for three terms in the United States House of Representatives.

In 1988 he received the Democratic nomination for the United States Senate, but lost in a very close race for that office to Connie Mack III.

Lieutenant governor
MacKay won the 1990 Democratic primary for lieutenant governor on the ticket headed by former U.S. Senator Lawton Chiles, who had held the Senate seat MacKay had unsuccessfully sought two years earlier. They won the election and were re-elected in 1994, the latter campaign being a close contest against the Republican ticket headed by Jeb Bush.

As lieutenant governor, MacKay was co-chair of the Florida Commission on Education, Reform and Accountability. He was regarded as the most significant and powerful lieutenant governor in Florida's history.

MacKay was a strong supporter of the use of capital punishment, as was Chiles. When he was asked during the 1998 gubernatorial election campaign about his positions on use of the death penalty and electric chair in Florida, he replied: "I support the death penalty and support the use of the electric chair so long as it operates in a reliable fashion." However he suggested that Florida should change its mode of execution after Pedro Medina's botched execution, saying: "The last thing we want to do is generate sympathy for these killers."

Gubernatorial candidate
In 1998, MacKay sought to succeed the term-limited Chiles as governor, easily winning the Democratic nomination with his full support. However, MacKay secured only 44.7% of the vote, losing to Republican nominee Jeb Bush, who had narrowly lost the 1994 contest but secured 55.3% of the vote in 1998.

Governor

Despite his defeat, MacKay became Chiles' successor when Chiles died unexpectedly on December 12, 1998. MacKay was at this time in Boston with his wife. When they returned to their hotel room, they found a message about Chiles' death, asking MacKay to get on a plane to Atlanta, where they were picked up by a state crew and flown through thick fog to Tallahassee. At 12.30 a.m. the next day, the 65-year-old MacKay was sworn in as Florida's 42nd governor at his Capitol office for the 24 days remaining in Chiles' term.

"There's no great pleasure in this," said MacKay about taking a job he had sought, but got for a short time after his political partner's death. He also stated how sorry he was that he would be unable because of the short time and lack of mandate to take care of such issues as education and health care.

Despite keeping a low public profile during his time as governor, MacKay made at least 56 appointments to various boards and to various offices, including two judgeships. He granted six pardons to female prisoners and was involved in such issues as the negotiation plan for the Everglades, and moderated some other disputes. Perhaps his most visible act as governor was signing Peggy Quince's nomination to the Florida Supreme Court. Quince was Chiles' last pick for the bench and it fell to MacKay, and then Bush, to sustain her nomination.

MacKay was succeeded by Bush on January 5, 1999.

Diplomacy and later life

After his governorship ended, MacKay retired from active politics. He, however, remains publicly active.

He was appointed by President Clinton as a special envoy for the Americas, being the second person to hold this position. During his tenure he traveled to 26 countries in the Americas, working on issues such as the Free Trade Area of the Americas (FTAA), the North American Free Trade Agreement (NAFTA), the Caribbean Basin Initiative (CBI), hemispheric security, strengthening the rule of law, labor standards, environmental policies and human rights.

He attended a “Day with Florida Governors” symposium, organized by the University of Central Florida and Louis Frey Institute on March 27, 2006, with Governor Bush and former governors Claude Roy Kirk Jr., Reubin Askew, Bob Graham and Bob Martinez (Wayne Mixson, who served for three days after Graham's resignation, wasn't present).

MacKay's memoir about his political career, How Florida Happened, was published by the University Press of Florida in March 2010.

Electoral history

Florida Senate, 6th district (1974)
 Buddy MacKay (D) – 26,418 (75.32%)
Charles E. Curtis (R) – 8,655 (24.68%)

Florida Senate, 6th district (1978)
 Buddy MacKay (D, Inc.) – elected unopposed

United States Senate election in Florida, 1980 (Democratic primary)
Richard Stone (Inc.) – 355,287 (32.08%)
Bill Gunter – 335,859 (30.33%)
 Buddy MacKay – 272,538 (24.61%)
Richard A. Pettigrew – 108,154 (9.77%)
James L. Miller – 18,118 (1.64%)
John B. Coffey – 17,410 (1.57%)

Florida's 6th congressional district, 1982
 Buddy MacKay (D) – 85,825 (61.35%)
Ed Havill (R) – 54,059 (38.65%)

Florida's 6th congressional district, 1984
 Buddy MacKay (D, Inc.) – 167,409 (99.30%)
Eric Tarnley (write-in) – 1,174 (0.70%)

Florida's 6th congressional district, 1986
Buddy MacKay (D, Inc.) – 143,598 (70.16%)
Larry Gallagher (R) – 61,069 (29.84%)

United States Senate election in Florida, 1988 (Democratic primary)
Bill Gunter – 383,721 (38.00%)
 Buddy MacKay – 263,946 (26.14%)
Dan Mica – 179,524 (17.78%)
Pat Frank – 119,277 (11.81%)
Claude Roy Kirk Jr. – 51,387 (5.09%)
Fred Rader – 11,820 (1.17%)

Florida United States Senate election, 1988 (Democratic runoff)
 Buddy MacKay – 369,266 (52.00%)
Bill Gunter – 340,918 (48.00%)

Florida United States Senate election, 1988
Connie Mack III (R) – 2,051,071 (50.42%)
 Buddy MacKay (D) – 2,016,553 (49.57%)
Adam Straus (write-in) – 585 (0.01%)

Democratic primary for lieutenant governor, 1990
 Buddy MacKay – 746,325 (69.49%)
Tom Gustafson – 327,731 (30.51%)

Florida gubernatorial election, 1990
Lawton Chiles/Buddy MacKay (D) – 1,995,206 (56.51%)
Bob Martinez/J. Allison DeFoor (R) – 1,535,068 (43.48%)

Democratic primary for lieutenant governor, 1994
 Buddy MacKay (Inc.) – 603,657 (72.17%)
James H. King – 232,757 (27.83%)

Florida gubernatorial election, 1994
 Lawton Chiles/Buddy MacKay (D, Inc.) – 2,135,008 (50.75%)
Jeb Bush/Tom Feeney (R) – 2,071,068 (49.23%)

Florida gubernatorial election, 1998
 Jeb Bush/Frank Brogan (R) – 2,191,105 (55.27%)
 Buddy MacKay/Rick Dantzler (D) – 1,773,054 (44.72%)

Source: Our Campaigns – Candidate – Kenneth "Buddy" MacKay Jr.

References

External links

Official Governor's portrait and biography from the State of Florida
MacKay's biography from Lawton Chiles Foundation website
Biography from Congressional Bioguide
Governor MacKay statement after Chiles' death

|-

|-

|-

|-

|-

|-

|-

|-

|-

|-

1933 births
American Presbyterians
Democratic Party Florida state senators
Democratic Party governors of Florida
Lieutenant Governors of Florida
Democratic Party members of the United States House of Representatives from Florida
Living people
Democratic Party members of the Florida House of Representatives
Military personnel from Florida
Politicians from Ocala, Florida
United States Air Force officers
University of Florida alumni
Writers from Florida
20th-century American politicians
Fredric G. Levin College of Law alumni